Abbemyia is a genus of flies in the family Dolichopodidae, known from Australia and New Caledonia. It is named after the French entomologist Abbé Octave Parent, who studied the family Dolichopodidae.

Species
Abbemyia baylaci Bickel, 2002
Abbemyia nigrofasciata (Macquart, 1850) (Synonyms: Chrysosoma chetiscutatum Parent, 1932, Chrysosoma regale Parent, 1932)
Abbemyia taree Bickel, 1994

References

Dolichopodidae genera
Sciapodinae
Diptera of Australasia